The 42ème Tour de Corse - Rallye de France, the fifth round of the 2006 World Rally Championship season took place between April 7 and April 9 2006.

Results

Special stages
All dates and times are CEST (UTC+2).

References

External links
 Results at eWRC.com
 Results at Jonkka's World Rally Archive

Corse, Tour de
Corse, Tour de
Corse, Tour de
Tour de Corse